The Avoyel or Avoyelles were a small Native American tribe who at the time of European contact inhabited land near the mouth of the Red River at its confluence with the Atchafalaya River near present-day Marksville, Louisiana. Also called variously Shi'xkaltī'ni (Stone-Arrow-Point people) in Tunican and Tassenocogoula, Tassenogoula, Toux Enongogoula, and Tasånåk Okla in the Mobilian trade language; all names (including the autonym Avoyel) are said by early French chroniclers to mean either "Flint People" or "People of the Rocks". This is thought to either reflect their active trading of flint for tools from local sources on their land in the eponymously named modern Avoyelles Parish or more likely as their status as middlemen in trading flint from Caddoan peoples to their north to the stone deficit Atakapa and Chitimacha peoples of the Gulf Coast.

The Avoyel were also known by the French as the petits Taensas (English: Little Taensa), who were mentioned in writings by explorer Pierre Le Moyne d'Iberville in 1699. However, they are a different group than the Natchezan speaking Taensa or grand Taensas.

Language
The Avoyel language may have been related to the Natchez language.

History
Described by some historians as being a Caddoan group, and by others as a Natchezan member of the Mary Haas' Gulf hypothesis Muskogean Language Macrofamily along with the Natchez and Taensa; their true linguistic and ethnic affiliation is somewhat uncertain because no written or spoken version of their language has survived.

At the time of European contact they lived in a number of villages on the Red River in locations near present-day Alexandria and a palisaded village near Marksville. They controlled the river to its confluence with the lower Black River, Upper Atchafalaya River and the Mississippi.

Never numerous, they are recorded by the French as numbering 280 in 1698, and with their population declining markedly after that. They were likely affected by the same drastic decimation as were other native groups, primarily due to new infectious diseases unwittingly carried by Europeans to which they had no acquired immunity. By 1805 the Avoyel were said to number only two or three women. The Avoyel survivors were believed to have been absorbed by marriage into the neighboring Tunica, Ofo, and Biloxi peoples who had moved to the area sometime in the late 1780s or 1790s because of encroachment by Euro-Americans at their previous locations.

See also
 Tunica-Biloxi

References

External links
 The Avoyel-TaensaTribe/Nation of Louisiana Inc.

Natchez
Plaquemine Mississippian culture
Native American tribes in Louisiana
Unattested languages of North America